Stanley Leon Jackson (born October 10, 1970) is an American former professional basketball player, at the shooting guard position. He played briefly in the National Basketball Association (NBA), as well as several other top leagues around the world.

Born in Tuskegee, Alabama, Jackson played collegiately at the University of Alabama-Birmingham, after attending the Valley High School in Valley, Alabama. Undrafted in 1993, he made the Minnesota Timberwolves' roster for the upcoming season, going on to appear in 17 regular season matches in his only National Basketball Association spell.

Subsequently, Jackson spent the next years overseas, playing in Cyprus, Spain and France (namely with ÉS Chalon-sur-Saône, where he stayed from 2000 to 2005), also having spells in the North American minor leagues.

References

External links
 
 Basketpedya career data

1970 births
Living people
Sportspeople from Tuskegee, Alabama
American expatriate basketball people in Cyprus
American expatriate basketball people in France
American expatriate basketball people in Spain
American men's basketball players
Basketball players from Alabama
Real Betis Baloncesto players
Élan Chalon players
Florida Beachdogs players
Liga ACB players
Minnesota Timberwolves players
Shooting guards
SIG Basket players
UAB Blazers men's basketball players
Undrafted National Basketball Association players